The Women's individual competition of the Vancouver 2010 Paralympics is held at Whistler Olympic Park in Whistler, British Columbia. The competition is scheduled for Wednesday, March 17.

12.5 km Visually Impaired
In the biathlon 12.5 km visually impaired, the athlete with a visual impairment has a sighted guide. The two skiers are considered a team, and dual medals are awarded.

10 km Sitting

12.5 km Standing

See also
Biathlon at the 2010 Winter Olympics – Women's individual

References

External links
2010 Winter Plympics biathlon schedule and results, at the official website of the 2010 Winter Paralympics in Vancouver

Biathlon at the 2010 Winter Paralympics
Winter Paralympics
Biath